Byzantine time is a method of keeping time that originated in the Byzantine Empire.

It is now rarely used save for in Eastern Orthodox monasteries, for example, on Mount Athos in Greece and Mar Saba monastery in the West Bank. Ethiopia (where a branch of the Orthodox church is the largest religion of the country) also uses this type of timing. 

In Byzantine time, hour 0:00:00 begins daily at sunset rather than midnight. Due to seasonal variations in the length of a day, hour zero can vary by several hours throughout the year. The Byzantine calendar is a related method of keeping dates.

See also
Civil time
Decimal time

References

External links
Byzantine time  at Diatheke.org

Byzantine culture
Mount Athos
Time scales
Time measurement systems